Tame Horomona Rehe, also known by the anglicised name Tommy Solomon, (7 May 1884 – 19 March 1933) is believed by most to have been the last Moriori of unmixed ancestry. Moriori are the indigenous people of the Chatham Islands.

Early life
Solomon was born at Waikaripi in the Chatham Islands and raised on the Moriori Reserve near Manukau Point. His mother died in 1903 but because of his youthful irresponsibility the interest in her land was vested in his father during his lifetime.

Career as farmer
Solomon was married in 1903 to Ada Fowler of the Kāi Tahu iwi and began learning the trade of sheep farmer first on leased land and then on the family holding which gradually increased in size as the other Moriori people died off. When his father and his wife died in 1915 Solomon was running 7000 sheep and a herd of cattle on the family farm. He remarried in 1916 to Whakarawa, the niece of his first wife and subsequently had five children. During the 1920s Solomon became known as one of the most successful farmers in the Chatham Islands. He took an active part in the social and political life of the Chatham Islands and was widely respected for his generosity and his conciliatory nature; it was as the "last full-blooded Moriori" however that he was best known.

Family
As the Kāi Tahu are a South Island Māori tribe rather than Moriori, Solomon's children were considered of mixed descent. Modern scholars, however, reject the concept of a phylogenetically much distinct Moriori, and instead consider them a culturally distinct offshoot of an early (pre-Kai Tahu) South Island Māori group, as evidenced by similarities between the Moriori language and the k-dialect of southern Māori. There are still many people of partial Moriori descent both in the Chatham Islands and in mainland New Zealand, and the Moriori are today generally considered a distinct cultural rather than racial entity.

Death and legacy
Solomon died of pneumonia and heart failure in 1933. Whati Tuuta, the son of his friend George Tuuta, built his coffin. In 1986, a statue was made to commemorate him; it can be found at Manukau close to his farm.

References

External links
Photograph of Solomon in Christchurch, 1925

1884 births
1933 deaths
Deaths from pneumonia in New Zealand
New Zealand farmers
Moriori people
New Zealand Māori farmers
People from the Chatham Islands